Homestead Manor is a property in Thompson Station, Tennessee that dates from 1809 and that was listed on the National Register of Historic Places in 1977.

It includes Georgian architecture.

It has been operated as a restaurant in recent years.  There is a 50-acre conservation easement.

References

Houses on the National Register of Historic Places in Tennessee
Houses in Williamson County, Tennessee
Georgian architecture in Tennessee
Houses completed in 1809
National Register of Historic Places in Williamson County, Tennessee